Christin Petelski (born December 29, 1977) is a former competition swimmer and breaststroke specialist who represented Canada at two consecutive Summer Olympics in 1996 and 2000.  At the 1996 Summer Olympics in Atlanta, Georgia, she finished eighth position in the final of the women's 200-metre breaststroke.  Four years later at the 2000 Summer Olympics in Sydney, Australia, she advanced to the semifinals of the 100-metre and 200-metre breaststroke, finishing 10th and 13th, respectively.  Petelski was also a member of the sixth-place Canadian team in the women's 4x100-metre medley relay at the 2000 Olympics.

References

External links
 
 
 

1977 births
Living people
Canadian female breaststroke swimmers
Olympic swimmers of Canada
Sportspeople from Nanaimo
Swimmers at the 1996 Summer Olympics
Swimmers at the 2000 Summer Olympics
Commonwealth Games competitors for Canada
Swimmers at the 1998 Commonwealth Games
Swimmers at the 2002 Commonwealth Games
20th-century Canadian women
21st-century Canadian women